Wynton Alan Whai Rufer  (born 29 December 1962) is a New Zealand retired professional footballer who played as a striker. He spent more than a decade of his professional career in Switzerland and Germany, achieving his greatest success at Werder Bremen, where he won a total of four major titles and finished the top scorer in the UEFA Champions League 1993–94 season. He was also a member of the New Zealand national team in its first FIFA World Cup appearance in 1982. He was named the Oceania Footballer of the Century by the Oceania Football Confederation.

Club career

Early career
Rufer was born in Wellington to a Swiss father, Arthur Rufer, and a New Zealand Māori mother, Anne Hine Rufer (née Campbell). He affiliates to the Ngāti Porou iwi. After leaving the city's Rongotai College, he played his first football for Wellington Diamond United, Stop Out and Miramar Rangers.

After being voted New Zealand's Young Player of the Year in 1981 and 1982, Rufer attracted the attention of Norwich City manager Ken Brown, who invited the player and his older brother Shane Rufer to Norfolk for a trial. He impressed and signed a professional contract on 23 October 1981, becoming the first Kiwi to do so. However, he was denied a work permit to play in England, so he joined Fussballclub Zürich in May of the following year.

Switzerland
Rufer would play in Switzerland in the following seven years, also representing FC Aarau and Grasshopper Club Zürich: whilst at the former, he topped the scoring charts at 21 in the 1987–88 season, helping his club to the fourth place. With the Hoppers, he won the domestic cup, precisely against Aarau, and surpassed the 100-goal mark in his years in the country.

Werder Bremen
In the 1989 summer, Rufer signed with SV Werder Bremen, coached by Otto Rehhagel. His Bundesliga debut came on 29 July, in a 0–0 draw at FC St. Pauli, and his impact was immediate, as he netted six times in his first 13 league matches. Overall, he would play an enormous part in the side's achievements, pairing with Klaus Allofs up front: on 6 May 1992, both scored in the final of the season's UEFA Cup Winners' Cup, in Lisbon (2–0 win against AS Monaco FC).

In the 1992–93 league season, as Werder won the third championship in the club's history, Rufer finished second in the scoring charts, at 17. On 8 December 1993, he scored two against R.S.C. Anderlecht in the UEFA Champions League, in a 5–3 home win (Anderlecht led 3–0 with 25 minutes to go); he finished as that competition's topscorer, alongside FC Barcelona's Ronald Koeman, and added his second German Cup.

Rufer was voted Oceania's Player of the Year in 1989, 1990 and 1992.

Later years
In 1994–95, the 31-year-old left Bremen and moved to JEF United Ichihara of the J1 League, finishing as the club's leading scorer in his second year. When Rehhagel took on the task of resurrecting 1. FC Kaiserslautern's fortunes in 1996 – the club would eventually return to the top division, as champions – he called upon Rufer in February 1997, and he contributed with four goals in 14 second division matches.

Rufer returned to his country and successively represented Central United, North Shore United and Auckland Kingz, retiring at the age of nearly 40. He then founded a football coaching school, WYNRS, which produced football stars such as women's international Annalie Longo.

With his brother Shane, Rufer took on player-coaching duties at North Shore United in 1998, before coaching the national Under-16 men's squad ahead of the 1999 Junior World Cup Finals, notably achieving a draw against the Under-16 men's teams of Austria and win over Norway in an unofficial U-16 World Cup tournament in Nice, France in 1998. He was appointed player-coach of the country's first professional football team, Auckland Kingz, participating in the Australian Soccer League for two seasons before retiring in 2001, having been named Oceania's Player of the Century ahead of Frank Farina (Australia) and Christian Karembeu (France, of New Caledonia descent).

International career
Made his A-international debut for New Zealand against Kuwait on 16 October 1980 in the friendly international Merdeka Tournament in Malaysia aged 17 years and 291 days. Added late to the squad for New Zealand in their World Cup qualification campaign in 1981 and played his first World Cup qualifier on 14 December 1981 against Kuwait, aged 18, scoring in a 2–2 draw for the 1982 FIFA World Cup qualifiers, Rufer quickly established himself in the All Whites side. Late in the following year, he netted the 2–1 winner in the decisive playoff against China, which propelled the nation to its first World Cup ever.

In the final stages in Spain, 19-year-old Rufer was the youngest member of the squad, appearing in all three group losses, against Scotland, the Soviet Union and Brazil. In total, he gained 23 full caps, scoring 12 goals. From 1985–89, he only collected a total of five international appearances, namely due to the fact Zürich would not release him; from there until 1996, he did not appear for the national side at all.

Managerial career
In February 2014, Rufer was appointed manager of Papua New Guinea. He was also responsible for managing Papua New Guinea U19 at the 2014 OFC U-20 Championship.

Personal life

During his time in Switzerland, Rufer converted to Christianity and married his wife, Lisa, in 1986. They have two sons, Caleb and Joshua, who are also footballers. His brother Shane and his nephew Alex also played professional football and played for the New Zealand national team.

Career statistics

Club

International

Honours
Grasshoppers
 Swiss Cup: 1988–89
 Swiss Super Cup: 1989

Werder Bremen
 Bundesliga: 1992–93
 DFB-Pokal: 1990–91, 1993–94
 DFB-Supercup: 1993, 1994
 UEFA Cup Winners Cup: 1991–92

1. FC Kaiserslautern
 2. Bundesliga: 1996–97

Central United
 Chatham Cup: 1997

Individual
 New Zealand Young Player of the Year: 1981 and 1982
 Oceania Footballer of the Year: 1989, 1990, 1992
 FIFA Oceania Footballer of the Century
 UEFA Champions League Top-scorer: 1993–94
 Companion of the New Zealand Order of Merit, for services to soccer, in the 2008 Queen's Birthday Honours
 New Zealand Sports Hall of Fame: Inducted in 2005
 Maori Sports Hall of Fame: Inducted in 2007
 Rufer is a member of the FIFA Football Committee, with Pelé, Franz Beckenbauer, Michel Platini and Bobby Charlton. He is also involved with the FIFA Ambassadors Against Racism Committee.
 IFFHS Legends
IFFHS Oceania Men's Team of All Time: 2021

References

External links
 
 FC Zürich stats 
 Ultimate NZSoccer profile and biography
 Norwich City archives
 Wynton Rufer at Aussie Footballers
 
 
 
 The official WYNRS site

1. FC Kaiserslautern players
1962 births
1982 FIFA World Cup players
2. Bundesliga players
Association football forwards
Bundesliga players
Central United F.C. players
Companions of the New Zealand Order of Merit
Converts to Christianity
Expatriate footballers in England
Expatriate footballers in Germany
Expatriate footballers in Japan
Expatriate football managers in Papua New Guinea
FC Aarau players
FC Zürich players
Football Kingz F.C. players
North Shore United AFC players
People educated at Rongotai College
Grasshopper Club Zürich players
J1 League players
JEF United Chiba players
Living people
Miramar Rangers AFC players
National Soccer League (Australia) players
New Zealand international footballers
New Zealand association football coaches
New Zealand association footballers
New Zealand Māori sportspeople
New Zealand people of Swiss descent
New Zealand expatriate sportspeople in Germany
New Zealand expatriate sportspeople in England
New Zealand expatriate sportspeople in Japan
New Zealand expatriate sportspeople in Switzerland
Ngāti Porou people
Norwich City F.C. players
Papua New Guinea national football team managers
Swiss Super League players
SV Werder Bremen players
Stop Out players
Wellington United players
UEFA Champions League top scorers
New Zealand expatriate sportspeople in West Germany
Expatriate footballers in West Germany